Super (pronounced  Super , originally known only by the Vitarka Mudrā hand symbol) is a 2010 Indian Kannada-Telugu bilingual political drama film written and directed by Upendra. The film was released on 3 December 2010 in its Kannada version, and on 11 March 2011 in its Telugu version. This utopian film had a concept of a contrasting futuristic India set in the year 2030, and the contemporary image of India.

The film revolved around Subash, an NRI who is challenged by his fiancé who is completely modern in outlook to change India. Rest of the film shows how Subash tries to bring change in Indian country. The film generated humungous hype in media as it marked the comeback of Upendra as a director after 10 years of gap. The film received positive critical acclaim with critics praising the concept and screenplay.

With the title of the film depicted only by a symbol, it stars Upendra and Nayanthara and is produced by Rockline Venkatesh, while V. Harikrishna scored the music.

Plot

Cast
 Upendra as Subhash Chandra Gandhi (the name is a portmanteau of 'Subhash Chandra Bose and Mahatma 'Gandhi'—the former is known for his revolutionary views to attaining Indian freedom, and the latter, for his non-violence)
 Nayanthara as Indira
 Tulip Joshi as Mandira,  Indira's elder sister
 R. N. Sudarshan and Shylashri as Subhash's parents
 Sadhu Kokila and Ali as the Chaddi Brothers (term chaddi means shorts and is a parody on the Bellary Reddy Brothers who are alleged to have involved in mining scam)
 Jeeva as a cop
 Dhandapani as the Chief Minister
 Yograj Bhat is featured as an off-screen narrator (uncredited)
 Rockline Venkatesh (producer) guest stars as the leader of a folk dance troop

Production

Upendra returned to direction after nearly ten years. The nameless film was originally represented only by the hand symbol (seen in posters) and Upendra wanted the audience to name the film. The hand symbol could mean zero, or three or the Om symbol or Vitarka Mudrā (an ancient Buddhist gesture), public and media stuck to calling it Super.

Shooting began on 18 February 2010 at the Kanteerava Indoor Stadium with the planned schedule for 90 days which included various locations in Bengaluru, Dubai and London. It was produced by Rockline Venkatesh under the banner Rockline Productions, which is its 25th venture. The film saw the debut of Tamil-Malayalam actress Nayanthara in Kannada films. Being a multilingual film, several artists from Telugu and Tamil film industries like Ali, Kadal Dandapani, Jeeva are also featured.

Prior to release, much information about the film was kept under wraps. During the promotion of the film at an interview on a radio station, Upendra expressed his disappointment being labeled as a "different director" and explained that most of his directorial ventures deal with the things that he had undergone in his real life. When asked about the ten-year break, Upendra said he thought he would work on his acting career, but then it sucked him in like a vacuum which he could not get out of. After reaching a point where he was afraid he had lost his ability to direct films, he had to fight his fear and that is when he started working on the script of Super.

Theme
A symbol being the title of the film, it is replete with symbolism from the title sequence is displayed. Uppi has made the movie Super that is named after hand symbol completely a different film and that different trick starts right from the displaying title cards, which has never been attempted by anyone in Indian cinema. For instance, the credit for direction just shows "U" with an index finger pointing towards the audience. This story of India is narrated metaphorically through the story of Indira, the female lead.

Super depicts a Utopian India in the year 2030 where Indians are pictured to be wealthy, hard-working, and are seen wearing traditional clothing consisting of Ilkal saree and panche. In contrast, westerners are the ones taking care of menial jobs like taxi driving, janitorial, etc. It is a future where the rupee is valued 70 times the British pound and people who cannot speak Kannada are considered illiterates (and Westerners are visibly apologetic about the same). From this setting, the film regresses back to the current year 2010 where India is beset with problems of corruption, red-tapism, pollution and unemployment. Political satire is played out by using sounds of horses and donkeys when ministers appear on the screen, which represents the political horse trading witnessed in recent times in the state of Karnataka. Scenes of raping Indira and the auctioning process of an entire Indian state are interspersed to draw a parallel between the two. The film finds a climax back in 2030 where a foreigner asks an Indian as to who was responsible for all the good changes in India, and the film ends abruptly again with the index finger pointing at the audience, symbolizing that it's the people who are ultimately responsible for the course of a nation.

Release

India

In Karnataka, the Kannada version was released at over 180 theaters on 3 December 2010. The Telugu version of the film was released on 11 March 2011 in more than 95 screens across Andhra Pradesh. Fearing copyright violation, the production team postponed the international release to mid-2011 as there were chances of film getting leaked on the Internet during overseas release. Tamil film personality Rajinikanth flew to Bangalore to attend a private screening of the film arranged by the producer Rockline Venkatesh. The film saw a special screening in Infosys at its Mysore campus. It was also screened at the fourth Bengaluru International Film Festival (BIFF) in December 2011 as part of the 'political satire' category.  The film was later dubbed into Hindi as Rowdy Leader 2 by Goldmines Telefilms in 2017.

Overseas release
Kannada version of Super was released in the US by Upendra's close friend Shivamurthy. The film was screened in USA's Chicago and Edison, New Jersey. It was scheduled for two shows in the town of Matthews, North Carolina on 23 and 24 April at Cinemark Theatres. In the city of Garland, Texas, it was screened in August 2011. The film was released in Australia in late August 2011, by a Kannada film distributor in Australia, Arunroopesh. It was screened in Melbourne, Sydney, Adelaide, Brisbane and Perth.

Reception

Box office

Kannada
In Karnataka, the Kannada version was released at over 180 theaters on 3 December 2010. The film reported sold-out shows all over the state of Karnataka. Some fans who could not get hold of tickets any other way bought them on the black market. It celebrated 100 days of run at over 90 centres, 125 days of run at its main centre and 175 days of run at PVR in Bangalore.

Telugu
After receiving good response for the audio track, Super was released in Andhra Pradesh in its Telugu version on 11 March 2011. Screened at more than 95 theaters across Andhra Pradesh, Super had an opening across the state. Upendra was quite happy about receiving extraordinary reviews from Telugu and English daily newspapers and websites. It received a widespread appreciation from Telugu newspapers like Eenadu and Vaartha which described Super as 'Upendra's best creative attempt' and was reported to be doing well in Andhra Pradesh. Reviews on the websites were also quite positive about the film. According to Upendra, the film's good reviews boosted the collections and that the film as a whole has been appreciated and the fresh concept of the story has been widely discussed in media. The distributors were quite happy about the response received throughout Andhra Pradesh. According to the box office analysts of Andhra Pradesh, the film surprisingly caught the attention of the B, C centre audience in a big way and scored good success.

Critical reception
Critically, the film was widely well received in its Kannada version with the Times of India rating it 4/5 stars and describing that the film "succeeds in keeping the audience entertained with witty dialogs, neat script and lively narration, along with Upendra's antics, and, at times, his strange make-up." Deccan Herald termed the film as "something extraordinary" and praised Upendra's grand return to the direction "by confusing and exciting the audience right from the movie’s inception, with a hotchpotch of his trademark films and roles" while downplaying the characterization of heroines.

Sify called it a "revolutionary concept" in story-telling which "will make people ponder over the contemporary events and see how the country is plundered by the greedy politicians and corporate community." DNA India also rated it 4/5 stars with a consensus that "Upendra still has all it takes to churn movies that are 'his style,' but contemporary in nature and he puts forth a message through this film as well, as he ruthlessly mocks the current political scenario." Other reviewers have largely appreciated the multifaceted film for its technicality, complex script dished out in an out-of-the-box narratorial technique while keeping the commercial aspect intact. Performances of all artists, especially Upendra's, has been another highlighted feature of the film.

Special screenings

In 2011, Rajinikanth attended a private screening of Super arranged by the producer Rockline Venkatesh. "It all started a couple of months ago when I met Rajini sir and told him about the film I was going to produce with Uppi as director. When he heard the story of the film, he was very happy," said Rockline. "When he learnt that it was a hit, he was thrilled and asked me to hold a screening for him, too." After the screening, Rajinikanth commented: "I like watching Upendra's films and this was no exception. He is an excellent director and is one of a kind in the country. The kind of subject he has chosen is excellent. We need more films of this kind which are thought-provoking and also well-made. It's amazing that a film of this scale has been made in Kannada. If I get an opportunity and an impressive script, I'd like to do a Kannada film in the future."

The film saw a special screening in Infosys at its Mysore campus where thousands of employees, which included non-Kannadigas, watched the film. It was screened at the fourth Bangalore International Film Festival (BIFF) in December 2011.

Soundtrack

The Super soundtrack album rights was acquired by Madhu Bangarappa of Akash Audio for a record price of 12.5 million. Composed by V Harikrishna, the album has five songs and Upendra has penned lyrics for three and remaining two have been written by Yograj Bhat and V Manohar. It was officially released on 19 November at Leela Palace by Puneeth Rajkumar and Raghavendra Rajkumar.

Unlicensed copies of the album were available online within hours after the release, and a team was formed by the production unit to fight audio infringement. This resulted in some Kannada music websites being brought down permanently.

Awards

 Udaya Film Award for Best Screenplay
 Suvarna Film Awards 2011 - Favorite Film Award
 Suvarna Film Awards 2011  - Favorite Director Award

Notes

References

External links

 
 

Films set in Bangalore
2010 films
Films directed by Upendra
2010s Kannada-language films
Films set in the future
Indian satirical films
Films set in the 2030s
Films about corruption in India
Films scored by V. Harikrishna
Indian nonlinear narrative films
Indian political satire films
Films shot in Dubai
Rockline Entertainments films